Zaloňov is a municipality and village in Náchod District in the Hradec Králové Region of the Czech Republic. It has about 400 inhabitants.

Administrative parts
Villages of Horní Dolce, Rtyně and Vestec are administrative parts of Zaloňov.

References

Villages in Náchod District